Super United Sports, commonly known as SUS or Suspatis, is a Maldivian professional football club based in Machchangolhi in the city of Malé.

Club history
Youth football enthusiasts from Kaaminee Magu of Machchangolhi, Malé, formed a group named Suspatis during the early 2000s and started competing in local sports tournaments. They were officially registered as Super United Sports in 2016. They decided to register in the name Super United Sports, since the abbreviation SUS relates to Suspatis.

Super United Sports got promoted to Second Division as they reached the final of 2018 Third Division, after defeating The Bows Sports Club 13–1 in the semi-final. They were defeated 2–0 in the final to champion Rock Street.

SUS gained promotion to Dhivehi Premier League when the defeated Club PK in 2020 Second Division to reach the final by 2–1. They were defeated to Club Valencia by 3–1 in the final.

Domestic history

Players

Current squad
As of 8 January 2020

Coaching staff

Honours

League
 Second Division
Runners-up: 2020 Third DivisionRunners-up: 2018

References

External links
 Official website

Football clubs in the Maldives
Football clubs in Malé
Association football clubs established in 2016
2016 establishments in the Maldives
Dhivehi Premier League clubs